Thennala is a Grama panchayat in Malappuram district in the Indian state of Kerala. Thennala is known for its cultured population and localities. National Highway (NH-17) passes through the pookkipparamb. Parapanangadi is the nearest railway station (12 km) and Calicut International airport is the nearest airport (23 km).

Demographics
 India census, Thennala had a population of 49,214 with 23,753 males and 25,461 females.

Landmarks
 Shiva Temple, Arakkal
Tharayil juma masjid, Thennala Tharayil
 Hassaniya Orphanage
Amigos Youth Club (AYC), Karuthal
 CM Markaz, തെന്നല
KHMHSS, Valakkulam
AMLP School Arakkal Pullithara
MAM UP School Arakkal
Blaze thennala (BYC)
Al fathah girls school, west bazar
 Algebra Cultural Society, west bazar
 Gangx alungal

Rice
Tennala Rice is known for its quality and is used at the Chief Minister's kitchen in Thiruvananthapuram.

CM Markaz 
CM Markaz is an Islamic educational institution in Karuthal. Many Islamic scholars attended this institute. The Wafy degree is the major degree provided there. The students are from across southern India.

Transport
Tennala village connects to other parts of India through Tirur, Tanur, Parappanangadi town. National highway No.66 passes through Pookipparamba, while the northern stretch connects to Goa and Mumbai. The southern stretch connects to Cochin and Trivandrum. State Highway No.28 starts from Nilambur and connects to Ooty, Mysore and Bangalore through Highways.12, 29 and 181. 

The nearest airport is at Kozhikode. The nearest major railway station is at Parappanangadi.

References

External links 

 

Cities and towns in Malappuram district
Parappanangadi area